The People's Party FNB, until 2022 known as the People's Action No to More Road Tolls (FNB) is a political party of Norway. The single-issue party's stance is that road construction should be entirely funded through ordinary taxes and road tolls should be abolished. The party was founded in 2014 in Stavanger as a reaction to the plans to erect a toll ring in Stavanger/Sandnes. Starting off as a people's action, it was reformed as a party and ran in 2015 municipal elections, winning three municipal councilors. It was initially led by Frode Myrhol. At its first party convention, in 2020, a dispute around the leadership role lead to the party opting to have to joint party leaders, Frode Myrhol and Cecilie Lyngby.

For the 2019 election the party ran for eleven municipal and five county elections, winning seats in all locations, 51 in municipal and 17 in county councils. The highest results were achieved with 22.1 percent in Alver and 16.7 percent in Bergen, and as low as 1.5 percent in Vestfold og Telemark.

Support for the party plummeted during the 2021 parliamentary election, with the party only receiving 3.435 votes or 0.1 percent of the popular vote, placing the party as Norway's 18th largest.

The party changed its name from People's Action No to More Road Tolls to People's Party FNB in February 2022.

Results

Election results in the 2019 municipal elections:

Results from the 2019 county elections:

References

Political parties in Norway
Organisations based in Stavanger
Political parties established in 2014
2014 establishments in Norway
Single-issue political parties
Toll (fee)